Mugler v. Kansas, 123 U.S. 623 (1887), was an important United States Supreme Court case in which the 7–1 opinion of Associate Justice John Marshall Harlan and the lone partial dissent by Associate Justice Stephen Johnson Field laid the foundation for the Supreme Court's later acceptance and defense during the Lochner era of Justice Field's theory of economic substantive due process under the Due Process Clause of the Fourteenth Amendment.

The companion case was Kansas v. Ziebold & Hagelin.

Background
As part of the burgeoning temperance movement, the people of Kansas amended their state constitution on November 2, 1880:

The Kansas Legislature subsequently enacted an accompanying statute on February 19, 1881 that provided that after May 1, 1881, any person who manufactured or aided in the manufacture of any liquor without an appropriate permit would be guilty of a misdemeanor. First-time violators were to be fined not less than $100 nor more than $500 or to be imprisoned in the county jail for not less than 20 nor more than 90 days.

On March 7, 1885, the legislature supplemented the statute by providing that all places in which intoxicating liquors were manufactured, sold, bartered, or given away or kept for sale, barter, or use were a nuisance and subject to abatement where a court judged them so. Courts adjudicating nuisance complaints were to sit in equity; also, the statute required the state meet the burden of proving that the defendant did not possess a permit, in which case the judge must declare the place complained of a nuisance. Offending owners of nuisances were to be fined not less than $100 nor more than $500 or to be imprisoned in the county jail for not less than 30 nor more than 90 days.

In 1877, prior to the passage of the Kansas constitutional amendment and its accompanying statute, Peter Mugler had built a brewery in Salina, Kansas. He spent $10,000 on the brewery's construction and had obtained a corporate charter from the state allowing him to operate a brewery. It was completed in 1877 and used for the manufacture of intoxicating malt liquor, commonly known as beer, up until May 1, 1881. Following the enactment of the statute, Mugler did not obtain a permit for the manufacture or sale of alcohol. Further, the brewery-specific design of Mugler's facility allegedly made it difficult to employ in other trades, subsequently dropping the value of the building to only $2500.

Ziebold and Hagelin were operating a brewery in Atchison County, Kansas.

Procedural history
In November 1881, authorities indicted Peter Mugler in the District Court of Saline County, Kansas, for violation of the statutes. The first indictment contained five counts alleging that Mugler had sold, bartered, or given away intoxicating liquors without a permit and a sixth count alleging that his brewery was a public nuisance for being a place used in violation of the statute. The second indictment contained one count alleging Mugler had manufactured intoxicating liquors without a permit.

The District Court found Mugler guilty and fined him $100 and court fees. It subsequently rejected the defendant's motions for a new trial and for an arrest of judgment. The Kansas Supreme Court affirmed on appeal.

In August 1886, authorities filed an information in the District Court of Atchison County, Kansas against Ziebold and Hagelin for operating a brewery. On defendant's motion, the case was removed to the US Circuit Court under its equity jurisdiction. The Circuit Court dismissed the bill of information. The State of Kansas appealed.

Issue
Does a state law prohibiting the manufacture and sale of intoxicating liquors, subsequently rendering property used for the purposes described of little economic value, deprive the owner of that property in conflict with the Due Process Clause of the Fourteenth Amendment?

Mugler's attorney posited two arguments:
 A substantive due process argument that, under the Fourteenth Amendment, Kansas lacked any authority to prohibit the manufacture of intoxicating liquors for personal use or for the purpose of export.
 A takings argument citing the devaluation of Mugler's property from $10,000 to $2500 by the statute, the building's brewery-specific design, and the difficulty of employing the building in other lawful trades. Mugler's attorney backed this argument with the holding of Pumpelly v. Green Bay Co., which found the damming of a nearby river in order to improve navigation and had flooded the plaintiff's land, rendering it useless and without value, was a taking requiring compensation.

The attorney for Ziebold and Hagelin echoed Mugler's two arguments but posited an additional argument attacking the nuisance statute, which allowed for the destruction of all property used in keeping and maintaining the nuisance without a trial by jury, as a denial of due process. The state, according to Ziebold and Hagelin's attorney, was using the nuisance provision out of order; instead of trying and convicting the defendants first, and then subsequently declaring the property a nuisance on the fact of their conviction and enabling authorities to destroy the liquors, the state was instead using the nuisance statutes to convict the defendants without trial. The statute removed the presumption of innocence once the state had proved the owners of the alleged nuisance did not have a permit.

Decision
On December 5, 1887, the US Supreme Court upheld 7–1 the ruling of the Supreme Court of Kansas, thus affirming Mugler's convictions. Associate Justice John Marshall Harlan, writing for the majority, held that a state's legislation prohibiting the manufacture of intoxicating liquor within its jurisdiction does not infringe on any right or privilege secured by the Constitution of the United States. Addressing Mugler's first argument, the Court stated its belief that the principle requiring property holders not to use their property so as to be injurious to the community was compatible with the Fourteenth Amendment.

However, the Court decided that it possessed the power to inquire into the intentions of the legislature behind police power regulations to settle disputes over the relatedness of the regulation to a state's use of the police power.

Turning to Mugler's second argument, the Court found the authority for the statute in this case strictly relied upon Kansas's police power. Since the statute dealt with the health, the safety, and the morals of the population, the Court rejected Mugler's reliance on Pumpelly, distinguishing the Pumpelly case as a use solely of the state's power of eminent domain; the Court reasoned that a prohibition on the use of property, by valid legislation, for purposes of protecting the health and safety of the community cannot be deemed a taking or an appropriation of property for public benefit. Since the legislation did not restrict the owners control, right to dispose, or ability to use for lawful purposes, no taking had occurred.

Further, the Court held that states cannot be burdened with the condition that they must compensate individual owners for incidental losses suffered as a result of a prohibition on the use of property. Additionally, property values which depreciate as a result of the state's exercise of the police power is different from taking property for public use. In one case a nuisance is abated; in the other, property is taken away from the owner completely. If public safety requires certain action be taken by the legislature, lawmakers cannot be persuaded from discontinuing such activity because individuals will suffer incidental inconveniences.

See also
 The Slaughterhouse Cases, 
 Munn v. Illinois, 
 Allgeyer v. Louisiana, 
 Lochner v. New York,

External links
 

1887 in United States case law
Legal history of Kansas
United States substantive due process case law
United States Supreme Court cases
United States Supreme Court cases of the Waite Court
Takings Clause case law
1887 in Kansas
Criminal cases in the Waite Court
Salina, Kansas
Beer in Kansas
Alcohol law in the United States